Brephodrillia perfectus is a species of sea snail, a marine gastropod mollusk in the family Drilliidae.

Description 
The shell grows to a length of  6 mm.

Distribution 
This species occurs in the Pacific Ocean between Mexico and Panama.

References

External links 
 

perfectus